The following are the records of Iran in Olympic weightlifting. Records are maintained in each weight class for the snatch lift, clean and jerk lift, and the total for both lifts by the Islamic Republic of Iran Weightlifting Federation.

Current records

Men

Women

Historical records

Men (1998–2018)

References
General
 I.R. Iran Weightlifting Federation Senior Records

Specific

External links
 I.R. Iran Weightlifting Federation

records
Iran
Olympic weightlifting
weightlifting